The New Taipei City Gold Museum, formerly known as the Gold Ecological Park, is a museum of the gold mining industry in Ruifang District, New Taipei, Taiwan.

History
The museum was opened on 4 November 2004 by the Taipei County Government as Gold Ecological Park. After the formation of New Taipei City, the park was renamed Gold Museum, though as of December 2015, some signage still shows the old name, including the front entrance gate.

Architecture
The Gold Museum is an open-air museum consisting of several buildings and sites. The museum buildings used to be offices, dormitories, processing plants and other facilities of the Taiwan Metal Mining Corp. The Gold Museum includes the following: Gold Building, Experience the Benshan Fifth Tunnel, Crown Prince Chalet, Jin Shui Special Exhibition Hall, Gold Refining Building, and Four Joined Japanese-Style Residences.

Exhibitions
The Gold Building provides information about the discovery of gold in the area, with displays on the Benshan Tunnels, old mining equipment, mining transport systems and a brief introduction to the World War II Japanese Kinkaseki POW Camp on its first floor. The second floor introduces the properties of gold, with works of art made of gold and a world-record 220.30 kg 999.9 pure gold brick for visitors to see and touch.

The Crown Prince Chalet is a residence built in 1922 for the proposed visit of Crown Prince Hirohito to the area (a visit that never materialized). Decades later it was used by Chiang Kai-shek as lodging in the area.

Transportation
The museum is accessible by bus from Ruifang Station of the Taiwan Railways.

See also
 List of museums in Taiwan
 Jinguashi Mine
 Ōgon Shrine
 Jinguashi

References

External links

 

2004 establishments in Taiwan
Geology museums in Taiwan
History of gold mining
Jewellery museums
Gold museums
Museums established in 2004
Museums in New Taipei